Entrains-sur-Nohain is a commune in the Nièvre department in central France.

Demographics
On 1 January 2019, the estimated population was 748.

Sister cities
Entrains fosters partnerships with the following places:
 Saranac Lake, New York, United States
 Monzingen, Rhineland-Palatinate, Germany

See also
Communes of the Nièvre department

References

Communes of Nièvre